Taer Innovation is a company that manufactures accessories that protect mobile devices from cracks and scratches.

Before the designed mobile accessories are sold to the public, the company offers a mock up to establish the suitability of the product to potential customers.

History
Before 2013,  self-healing protective cases were made using the in-mold decoration, IMD process. The application of this technology was costly since it necessitated the use of a membrane that was attached to a film. The film was placed on the phone's screen to protect the screen. Therefore, buying protective cases was expensive at that time.

In 2013, a new panel coating technology, geared to offer both screen and back panel protection, was discovered. The technology-enabled protective cases to withstand a scratching force of up to 750 grams. The protective cases would only take three minutes to self-heal from the scratching force.
In 2014, spray coating technology was discovered and later improved thorough research to form a transparent coat that prevented scratches. This technology brought the invention of the instant self-repair case.

Innerexile has stolen $157,015 from nearly 2500 people over Kickstarter campaign for their ThunderMag magnetic cable adaptor. As of March 2022 they have failed to provide an update to their customers since April 2020 on how far off the product is or when the backers are likely to be refunded.

Honors and awards 
Taer Innovation has won design awards, leading to a market footprint in more than thirty countries worldwide. Awards include Good Design award from 2012 to 2014, Golden Pin Design award, Taiwan Excellence award in 2014 and Computex d&I award in 2014 for their products.

References 

Mobile phone companies of China
Mobile phone culture